Nikola Stojiljković (born 17 August 1992) is a Serbian professional footballer who plays as a striker for Saudi Arabian club Al-Riyadh.

Club career

Rad
Born in Niš, Stojiljković spent his formatting years at Partizan and Rad. He made his Serbian SuperLiga debut with Rad on 30 May 2009, coming on as a substitute and providing a vital injury time assist in a 2–2 home draw with Vojvodina. During his tenure at Banjica, Stojiljković scored five goals in 26 league appearances, all of them in the 2011–12 season.

Čukarički
In the 2013 winter transfer window, Stojiljković moved to Serbian First League club Čukarički, scoring seven goals in 15 league appearances until the end of the 2012–13 season, thus helping them win promotion back to the top flight. With seven goals in the 2013–14 Serbian SuperLiga, Stojiljković was one of the most deserving for the team's success, finishing in fifth place in the competition, eventually securing them a spot in the 2014–15 UEFA Europa League. He scored two goals in the qualifying phase, including the winning goal against SV Grödig. Stojiljković finished the season as the club's top scorer with 14 goals in all competitions, helping them win the 2014–15 Serbian Cup, the club's first ever major title.

Braga
On 8 August 2015, Stojiljković was transferred to Portuguese club Braga, on a five-year deal. He made his debut for the club eight days later, coming on as a 61st-minute substitute for Rodrigo Pinho in a 2–1 home win over Nacional in the first game of the Primeira Liga season. Stojiljković scored his first goals as an Arsenalista on 21 September, a brace in a 5–1 win over Marítimo also at the Estádio Municipal de Braga. 

In September 2017, Stojiljković moved on loan to the Turkish side Kayserispor. After the end of 2017–18 campaign, he returned to Serbia in June 2018, joining Red Star Belgrade on a one-year loan deal.

Stojiljković signed on loan for Spanish Segunda División club RCD Mallorca in late January 2019. He made only four substitute appearances as they won promotion, having a two-month injury lay-off with muscular injury.

On 12 August 2019, Stojiljković was loaned to fellow Primeira Liga club Boavista F.C. for the season.

Farense
On 24 August 2020, Stojiljković transferred to Primeira Liga newcomers S.C. Farense, who purchased 50% of his economic rights.

Piast Gliwice
On 20 August 2021, Stojiljković was transferred to Polish Ekstraklasa team Piast Gliwice, on a two-year contract.

Al-Riyadh
On 20 August 2022, Stojiljković joined Saudi Arabian club Al-Riyadh.

International career
Stojiljković represented his country at under-17, under-19 and under-21 level. He missed out on the 2015 UEFA European Under-21 Championship due to an injury.

In March 2016, Stojiljković received his first call-up for the senior team for friendlies against Poland and Estonia. He made his debut in the former on the 23rd, starting in a 1–0 defeat at the Stadion Miejski in Poznań and being substituted for Filip Đuričić after 56 minutes.

Statistics

Club

International

Honours

Club
Čukarički
 Serbian Cup: 2014–15
Braga
 Taça de Portugal: 2015–16

Individual
 Serbian SuperLiga Team of the Season: 2014–15

Notes

References

External links
 
 
 
 
 

Serbian footballers
Association football forwards
Expatriate footballers in Portugal
Expatriate footballers in Turkey
Expatriate footballers in Spain
Expatriate footballers in Saudi Arabia
FK Čukarički players
FK Rad players
Red Star Belgrade footballers
S.C. Braga players
Kayserispor footballers
RCD Mallorca players
Boavista F.C. players
S.C. Farense players
Piast Gliwice players
Al-Riyadh SC players
Serbian SuperLiga players
Süper Lig players
Primeira Liga players
Segunda División players
Ekstraklasa players
Saudi First Division League players
Serbia international footballers
Serbia under-21 international footballers
Serbia youth international footballers
Serbian expatriate footballers
Serbian expatriate sportspeople in Portugal
Serbian expatriate sportspeople in Turkey
Serbian expatriate sportspeople in Spain
Serbian expatriate sportspeople in Saudi Arabia
Serbian First League players
Sportspeople from Niš
1992 births
Living people
Expatriate footballers in Poland